Large-cell lung carcinoma (LCLC), or large-cell carcinoma (LCC) in short, is a heterogeneous group of undifferentiated malignant neoplasms that lack the cytologic and architectural features of small cell carcinoma and glandular or squamous differentiation. LCC is categorized as a type of NSCLC (non-small-cell lung carcinoma) which originates from epithelial cells of the lung.

Presentation

Patients typically present with a non-productive cough and weight loss.

Diagnosis
LCC is, in effect, a "diagnosis of exclusion", in that the tumor cells lack light microscopic characteristics that would classify the neoplasm as a small-cell carcinoma, squamous-cell carcinoma, adenocarcinoma, or other more specific histologic type of lung cancer.

LCC is differentiated from small-cell lung carcinoma (SCLC) primarily by the larger size of the anaplastic cells, a higher cytoplasmic-to-nuclear size ratio, and a lack of "salt-and-pepper" chromatin.

Classification
The newest revisions of the World Health Organization (WHO) "Histological Typing of Lung Cancer schema" include several variants of LCC, including:
 giant-cell carcinoma of the lung
 basaloid large-cell carcinoma of the lung
 clear-cell carcinoma of the lung
 lymphoepithelioma-like carcinoma of the lung
 large-cell lung carcinoma with rhabdoid phenotype
 large-cell neuroendocrine carcinoma of the lung.

Large-cell neuroendocrine carcinoma (LCNEC)

One clinically significant subtype is "large-cell neuroendocrine carcinoma" (LCNEC), which is believed to derive from neuroendocrine cells.

In addition, a "subvariant", called "combined large-cell neuroendocrine carcinoma" (or c-LCNEC), is recognized under the new system. To be designated a c-LCNEC, the tumor must contain at least 10% LCNEC cells, in combination with at least 10% of other forms of NSCLC.

Pathology images

Incidence

In most series, LCLC's comprise between 5% and 10% of all lung cancers.

According to the Nurses' Health Study, the risk of large cell lung carcinoma increases with a previous history of tobacco smoking, with a previous smoking duration of 30 to 40 years giving a relative risk of approximately 2.3 compared to never-smokers, and a duration of more than 40 years giving a relative risk of approximately 3.6.

Another study concluded that cigarette smoking is the predominant cause of large cell lung cancer. It estimated that the odds ratio associated with smoking two or more packs/day for current smokers is 37.0 in men and 72.9 in women.

Notable people with the condition include American comedian Andy Kaufman, who died from the disease in 1984.

References

External links 

 . World Health Organization Histological Classification of Lung and Pleural Tumours. 4th Edition.

Lung cancer